The Standing Orders Committee (Malay: Jawatankuasa Peraturan Mesyuarat; ; Tamil: மலேசிய நிருபர் நிலை) is a select committee of the Senate in the Parliament of Malaysia that considers from time to time and report on all matters relating to the Standing Orders which may be referred to it by the Senate.

Membership

14th Parliament
As of April 2019, the members of the committee are as follows:

See also
Parliamentary Committees of Malaysia

References

External links
STANDING ORDERS COMMITTEE - SENATE

Parliament of Malaysia
Committees of the Parliament of Malaysia
Committees of the Dewan Negara